Peter Laurentius Larsen (August 10, 1833 – March 1, 1915) was a Norwegian-American educator and Lutheran theological leader. He was the founding president of Luther College.

Background
Peter Laurentius Larsen was born in Kristiansand in the county of Lister og Mandals Amt, Norway.  He was an 1855 doctoral graduate at the Royal Frederick University. Laur. Larsen was ordained in Christiania during 1857 and subsequently immigrated to the United States in response to a call issued by the Norwegian Evangelical Lutheran Church. He served as a pastor near Rush River, Pierce County,  Wisconsin  from 1857 until 1859.

The Norwegian Evangelical Lutheran Church decided on October 10, 1857, to create a college to supply ministers for Norwegian congregations in the Upper Midwest. It decided that students should be sent to Concordia College and Seminary in Missouri and that a Norwegian professorship should be established there. Laur. Larsen was appointed to the Norwegian theology professorship, entering officially upon his duties October 14, 1859. With the outbreak of the American Civil War, disorders arose in St. Louis. When Concordia College and Seminary closed in April, 1861, Professor Larsen and his students returned home.

Luther College
At its meeting in June 1861, the church decided to proceed at once to establish its own college.  College authorities decided to make use of a newly erected vacant parsonage at Halfway Creek, just north of La Crosse, Wisconsin. Lutheran College opened September 1, 1861, with two teachers, Larsen and F. A. Schmidt. In the summer of 1862 the school was transferred to Decorah, Iowa.  Larsen served as President of Luther College from 1861. He supervised the construction of the college's first Main building and its subsequent rebuilding after a devastating fire in 1889. Larsen also acted in a number of capacities as president. Not only was he the chief executive officer, but he also directed admissions, financial matters, curriculum, and fund raising, served as campus pastor and taught a diverse range of subjects. Although he resigned from the presidency in 1902, he continued to teach there until 1911.

Laur. Larsen was vice-president of the Norwegian Synod, 1876 until 1893. He was the acting President of the Evangelical Lutheran Synodical Conference of North America from 1880 until 1882. Larsen helped edit the Norwegian language publication Church Monthly (Norwegian: Kirkelig Maanedstidende) and its successor, Evangelical Lutheran Church Times (Norwegian: Evangelisk Luthersk Kirketidende). His articles appeared in the Norwegian language literary magazine Symra. Larsen was appointed a Knight of the 1st Class in the Royal Norwegian Order of St. Olav in 1908 and was awarded an honorary doctorate at Concordia Seminary.

Selected works
Historisk Fremstilling af den Strid, som i Aarene 1861 til 1868 indenfor den norske Synode i Amerika har været ført i Anledning af Skriftens Lære om Slaveri (Madison, Wisconsin: 1868)
Inkorporationsartikler, Bilove og gjældende Bestemmelser for dens Institutioner Embedsmend og Virksomhed (Decorah, Iowa: 1901)
Nogle gamle minder (in Symra 1913)

Personal life
Peter Laurentius Larsen was married twice. He married Karen Randine Neuberg (1833–1871) in Bergen, Norway in 1855. He later married Ingeborg Astrup (1846–1923), in 1872. His son Jakob Larsen as well as other of his 12 children held important positions within the American Lutheran church, colleges and universities

Laur. Larsen Hall
Laurentius Larsen Hall, first opened in 1907, is a residence hall at Luther College. It also houses the international student office, study abroad resource center, and health service. The hall is named for Peter Laurentius Larsen, who was the first president of Luther College.

References

Other sources
Larsen, Karen  Laur. Larsen: Pioneer College President (Norwegian-American Historical Association. Northfield, MN: 1936)
Larsen, Karen The Adjustment of a Pioneer Pastor to American Conditions, Laur. Larsen, 1857–1880 (in Norwegian-American Studies and Records, 1929)

External  links
Peter Laurentius Larsen by Herbjørn Gausta, (1885)
Luther College biography

1833 births
1915 deaths
University of Oslo alumni
Norwegian emigrants to the United States
19th-century American Lutheran clergy
Clergy from Kristiansand
Writers from Iowa
Religious leaders from Wisconsin
19th-century Norwegian Lutheran clergy